Heidar Shonjani or Haydar Shonjani (16 December 1945 – 8 November 2020), was an Iranian swimmer and water polo player.

Career
His first international tournament was the 1964 Summer Olympics, where he became the first Iranian swimmer to participate in the Summer Olympics; he swam 100 m freestyle, but failed to reach the final. Shonjani was a member of Iran national water polo teams that won a gold medal at the 1974 Asian Games and competed in the 1976 Summer Olympics, finishing 12th.

References

1945 births
2020 deaths
People from Bandar-e Anzali
Iranian male swimmers
Iranian male water polo players
Swimmers at the 1964 Summer Olympics
Water polo players at the 1976 Summer Olympics
Asian Games gold medalists for Iran
Asian Games medalists in water polo
Water polo players at the 1970 Asian Games
Water polo players at the 1974 Asian Games
Swimmers at the 1970 Asian Games
Swimmers at the 1974 Asian Games
Olympic swimmers of Iran
Olympic water polo players of Iran
Medalists at the 1974 Asian Games
Sportspeople from Gilan province
20th-century Iranian people